Scattersville is an unincorporated community in Loudoun County, Virginia, United States. Scattersville is located to the northwest of Lucketts along the eastern flanks of Catoctin Mountain.

Unincorporated communities in Loudoun County, Virginia